Sarah Louise Illingworth (born 9 September 1963) is an English-born New Zealand former cricketer who played as a wicket-keeper and right-handed batter. She appeared in 6 Test matches and 37 One Day Internationals for New Zealand between 1988 and 1996. She played domestic cricket for Southern Districts and Canterbury.

Illingworth captained New Zealand in all six Test matches she played, all of them ending in a draw. She also captained 29 WODIs, with New Zealand winning 18, losing 10 and one ending in a no result. She jointly holds the record for the most dismissals in a World Cup innings, with six.

References

External links

1963 births
Living people
Canterbury Magicians cricketers
Cricketers from Lancaster, Lancashire
New Zealand women cricket captains
New Zealand women cricketers
New Zealand women One Day International cricketers
New Zealand women Test cricketers
New Zealand women's One Day International captains
New Zealand women's Test captains
Southern Districts women cricketers
Wicket-keepers